Sigma Sound Studios was a recording studio in Philadelphia, Pennsylvania, U.S.. It was founded in 1968 by recording engineer Joseph Tarsia.

Located at 212 North 12th Street in Philadelphia, it was one of the first studios in the United States to offer 24-track recording capacity and the first anywhere to successfully employ console automation. Tarsia, formerly chief engineer at Philadelphia's Cameo-Parkway Studios, also opened Sigma Sound Studios of New York City in 1977 at the Ed Sullivan Theater building.

History

Recording 
From the beginning, Sigma Sound was strongly associated with Philadelphia soul and, in the 1970s, the sound of Gamble and Huff's Philadelphia International Records (its driving rhythm a precursor to disco music), as well as the classic, sophisticated productions of Thom Bell. Both featured large productions with strings and horns creating what became known as "The Sound of Philadelphia," or "T.S.O.P.", a term which became trademarked and was the title of the chart-topping theme song from the TV show, "Soul Train". Their success attracted many artists and producers from various music genres across the US, as well as Europe and Japan. By the late 1970s, Sigma was operating 10 music rooms on a 24-7 schedule. Sigma's long-time general manager, Harry Chipetz, managed the business operations and worked hand-in-hand with Tarsia in developing a staff that numbered close to 50 at its peak. Sigma is credited with well over 200 gold and platinum awards with an extensive client list that begins with Aretha Franklin and ends with ZZ Top.

Classic Philly Soul albums recorded at Sigma Sound include I Miss You by Harold Melvin & the Blue Notes, Back Stabbers and Ship Ahoy by The O'Jays, and Spinners by The Spinners. David Bowie recorded much of his album Young Americans in August 1974 at Sigma Philadelphia.  Madonna used the New York studios to record her 1983 debut album, Madonna. On April 15, 1972, singer-songwriter and pianist Billy Joel and his touring band played an hour-long concert at Sigma Studios. The recording of "Captain Jack" from this event received extensive radio play in the Philadelphia area, long before Joel became widely known, which helped him establish a national following.

Sale and closure 
Tarsia sold the New York studios in 1988 and the Philadelphia location in 2003, but they still retained the Sigma Sound Studios name. The 6,000 unclaimed tapes from Sigma's 35-year-old tape library are now part of The Drexel University Audio Archive. In 2019, Drexel University's MAD Dragon Music Group released 14 formerly-lost tracks from funk-soul group Nat Turner Rebellion that had been a part of the archive.

It was reported in the April 2015 issue of Pro Sound News, (a NewBay Media publication), that "the building that houses the historic Sigma Sound Studios in Philadelphia has been sold for $1.55 million, with the intention of renovating the space for office, retail or residential use." The studios had closed for business in 2014, according to the www.philly.com website. When checked on April 9, 2015, the Sigma Sound Studios website was still available for viewing, but it has since been taken down.

Legacy 
On October 15, 2015, the original building for Sigma Sound Studios was officially dedicated as a historic site by the City of Philadelphia. The historic site marker was placed at 212 N. 12th Street.

On November 13, 2020 the Sigma Studios building (212 N 12th St) — birthplace of the famous “Philly Sound” — won a spot on the Philadelphia Register of Historic Places, protecting the beloved cultural landmark from demolition.

Special Collections Research Center 
Information on Sigma Sound Studios exists at the Special Collections Research Center at Temple University in Philadelphia. The memorabilia available includes newspaper and magazine clippings, collected ephemera and other publications. There are also photographs of both the New York City and Philadelphia studios, as well as advertising and promotional materials which include "AddZest" materials that are primarily in Japanese. Additionally, there is a limited selection of several types of studio records, and clippings.

References

External links
 The defunct Sigmasound.com Web site from Archive.org
 Journal on the Art of Record Production - Capturing That Philadelphia Sound: A Technical Exploration Of Sigma Sound Studios

1968 establishments in Pennsylvania
2014 disestablishments in Pennsylvania
Buildings and structures in Philadelphia
Culture of Philadelphia
Recording studios in the United States